Kaci Sedkaoui (born July 4, 1986 in Draâ Ben Khedda) is an Algerian football player. He currently plays for ASO Chlef in the Algerian Ligue Professionnelle 1.

Club career
On July 24, 2011, Sedkaoui signed a two-year contract with JS Kabylie. On September 6, 2011, he made his debut for the club as a 58th-minute substitute in a league match against MC Alger.

References

External links
 DZFoot Profile
 

1986 births
Living people
Algerian footballers
Algerian Ligue Professionnelle 1 players
Algerian Ligue 2 players
JS Kabylie players
NA Hussein Dey players
RC Kouba players
People from Tizi Ouzou Province
Kabyle people
Association football midfielders
21st-century Algerian people